Hintonia is a plant genus in the family Rubiaceae.

Species 
 Hintonia latiflora
 Hintonia lumaeana
 Hintonia octomera
 Hintonia pulchra (now Osa pulchra)
 Hintonia standleyana

References

External links

Rubiaceae genera
Catesbaeeae